Joost is a male Dutch first name. It derives from the name Jodocus, which can ultimately be traced back to St. Judoc, a Breton saint of the 7th century: Jodocus → Josse → Joos → Joost (the addition of an end-t is a peculiarity of the Dutch language, especially some local dialects). 

Sometimes the (originally Ancient Roman) name Justus was used to represent Joost. This may have led to confusion between Justus and Jodocus as the origin of Joost. In Dutch proper it is pronounced . In Afrikaans it is pronounced .

Given name

Historical
 Joost Berman, Dutch judge and poet
 Joos van Cleve, Netherlandish painter
 Jan Joest van Kalkar, Netherlandish painter
 Joost Bürgi, Swiss clockmaker and mathematician
 Joost de Soete, 16th century Dutch field marshal and Lord of Villers
 Joost Banckert, Dutch Vice Admiral
 Joost van den Vondel, German-Dutch writer and playwright
 Joost van Dyk, 17th century Dutch privateer
 Arnold Joost van Keppel, 17th century Dutch nobleman

Contemporary
 Joost Businger (born 1924), Dutch-American meteorologist
 Joost Eerdmans (born 1971), Dutch politician
 Joost Lagendijk (born 1957), Dutch politician
 Joost Manassen (1927–2019), Dutch-Israeli chemist
 Joost Swarte (born 1947), Dutch comic artist and graphical designer
 Joost Zwagerman (1963–2015), Dutch writer and poet
 Joost van der Westhuizen (1971–2017), South African rugby player

Surname
 Eddie Joost (1916–2011), American baseball player
 Gesche Joost (born 1974), German design researcher
 Oskar Joost (1898–1941), German musician
 Risto Joost (born 1980), Estonian conductor and operatic countertenor

Notes and references

Masculine given names
Dutch masculine given names
Estonian-language surnames